Rocklands is a neighborhood located within the Mitchells Plain urban area of the City of Cape Town in the Western Cape province of South Africa. It is located in the south western most corner of Mitchells Plain and borders the community of Strandfontein to its immediate west.

On 20 August 1983 the United Democratic Front, an important anti-apartheid organisation, was founded at the Rocklands Community Hall.

References

Suburbs of Cape Town